The 2014 Charles Sturt Adelaide International was a professional tennis tournament played on hard courts. It was the second edition of the tournament which was part of the 2014 ATP Challenger Tour. It took place in West Lakes, Australia between 3 and 9 February 2014.

Singles main-draw entrants

Seeds 

 1 Rankings as of 13 January 2014

Other entrants 
The following players received wildcards into the singles main draw:
  Harry Bourchier
  Jacob Grills
  Christopher O'Connell
  Marc Polmans

The following players used Protected Ranking to gain entry into the singles main draw:
  Roman Vögeli

The following players received entry from the qualifying draw:
  Ryan Agar
  Cameron Norrie
  Maverick Banes
  Dayne Kelly

Champions

Singles

 Bradley Klahn def.  Tatsuma Ito, 6–3, 7–6(11–9)

Doubles

 Marcus Daniell /  Jarmere Jenkins def.  Dane Propoggia /  Jose Rubin Statham, 6–4, 6–4

External links

Charles Sturt Adelaide International
Charles Sturt Adelaide International
Charles Sturt Adelaide International